Orbicella faveolata, commonly known as mountainous star coral, is a colonial stony coral in the family Merulinidae. Orbicella faveolata is native to the coral coast of the Caribbean Sea and the Gulf of Mexico and is listed as "endangered" by the International Union for Conservation of Nature. O. faveolata was formerly known as Montastraea faveolata.

Description

Colonies of this coral are solid and very large, forming a mound with a skirt. The surface is smooth and undulating, with small lumps, bulges or lobes. The colour is usually a pale brown, yellowish green and grey but may be deep brown, with fluorescent green highlights. This coral is part of a species complex including the closely related Orbicella annularis and Orbicella franksi, but the former has more distinct nodules or small columns and the latter has a more irregular, lumpy surface.

Distribution and habitat
Orbicella faveolata occurs in shallow waters in the Caribbean Sea and the Gulf of Mexico, its range including Florida, united states, the Bahamas, Venezuela and possibly Bermuda.

Biology
Like other corals, Orbicella faveolata has a symbiotic relationship with a dinoflagellate in the genus Symbiodinium. These symbionts are commonly known as zooxanthellae and large numbers are present in the coral's living tissue. Several different species of Symbiodinium associate with the coral, depending on the degree of light intensity reaching the part of the surface where they reside. When artificial shading was applied by researchers to corals for some weeks, the Symbiodinium died out in the shaded portion. When the light was restored, zooxanthellae became reinstated, but in many instances, the original species was replaced by a different species of Symbiodinium.

The surface of the coral can be considered a microbiome, an ecological community of micro-organisms. The zooxanthellae, bacteria and archaea present vary with the time of year and in the spring (but not the autumn) their composition is also affected by the health of the coral and whether it is suffering from yellow-band disease.

Orbicella faveolata is related to the coral species lobed star coral (Orbicella annularis) and the species boulder star coral (Orbicella franksi) which both live in the Caribbean Sea and the Gulf of Mexico in areas such as the Bahamas and Bermuda. The species Paramontastraea saleborsa and Astrea curta have similarly sized corallites. The species P. saleborsa was also formally placed in the coral genus Montastraea.

Status
Orbicella faveolata is a slow-growing species and the rate at which new colonies are formed is less than the rate at which mature colonies die. It is susceptible to bleaching and to several coral diseases including yellow-band disease, black band disease and plague. Numbers of individuals are believed to have declined by over 50% in the last thirty years and the International Union for Conservation of Nature lists its conservation status as being "endangered".

References

Merulinidae
Coral reefs
Corals described in 1786
ESA threatened species